John Marston (birth registered second ¼ 1948  – 13 March 2013) was an English professional rugby league footballer who played in the 1960s and 1970s.

Background
Jack Marston's birth was registered in Hemsworth district, West Riding of Yorkshire, England, and he died aged 64 in St Gemma's Hospice, Leeds, West Yorkshire, England.

Playing career

County honours
Jack Marston represented Yorkshire.

Player's No.6 Trophy Final appearances
Jack Marston played in Wakefield Trinity's 11-22 defeat by Halifax in the 1971-72 Player's No.6 Trophy Final during the 1971-72 season at Odsal Stadium, Bradford on Saturday 22 January 1972.

Club career
Jack Marston made his début for Wakefield Trinity (replacing Neil Fox who had been sold to Bradford Northern the previous day) in the 8-11 defeat by Featherstone Rovers at Post Office Road, Featherstone on Saturday 23 August 1969.

References

External links

Search for "Marston" at rugbyleagueproject.org
Fond farewell to Jack the tenacious Trinity tackler
Photograph 'Jackie Marston tries to break' at rlhp.co.uk
Photograph 'Jack Marston in the clear' at rlhp.co.uk

1948 births
2013 deaths
Bradford Bulls players
English rugby league players
People from Hemsworth
Rugby league centres
Rugby league players from Wakefield
Wakefield Trinity players
York Wasps players
Yorkshire rugby league team players